Esencial may refer to:

 Esencial (Christian Chávez album), 2012
 Esencial (Mónica Naranjo album), 2013
 Esencial (Ricky Martin album), 2018

See also 
 Lo Esencial (disambiguation)